The Hesperentomidae are a family of hexapods in the order Protura.

Genera
 Hesperentomon Price, 1960
 Huhentomon Yin, 1977
 Ionescuellum Tuxen, 1960

References

Protura
Arthropod families